Jorge Aude (born 22 September 1946) is a former Uruguayan football player and coach. 
He even coached the El Salvador national football team on one occasion. He also coached several other clubs from Mexico, Guatemala and Uruguay.

References

External links
https://web.archive.org/web/20121003050342/http://www.esmas.com/deportes/futbol/395138.html

Uruguayan football managers
El Salvador national football team managers
Living people
1946 births
Uruguayan people of French descent